Murphys Ice Cream is a food company based in Dingle, County Kerry, Ireland. It uses the milk of Kerry cattle and serves coffees as well as ice creams and desserts. Seán and Kieran Murphy started Murphys Ice Cream in Dingle in 2000 with the goal of making the "best ice cream in the world". They make a range of usual and unusual flavours, including brown bread and sea salt.

Expansions 
In 2003, Murphys Ice Cream expanded into a new production facility and began supplying local restaurants and shops. In 2005, Murphys Ice Cream opened a second shop on Main Street in Killarney. In 2006, Murphys Ice Cream began using milk from Kerry cattle to support the indigenous breed. They have expanded their presence with a Dublin shop on Wicklow Street as well as a seasonal one in Tig Áine's, Ballyferriter.

References

External links

Food and drink companies of Ireland
Dingle
Ice cream brands